Qaleh-ye Mashhadi Karim (also Romanized as Qal‘eh-ye Mashhadī Karīm; also known as Qal‘eh-ye Karīm) is a village in Hamaijan Rural District, Hamaijan District, Sepidan County, Fars Province, Iran. At the 2006 census, its population was 84, in 25 families.

References 

Populated places in Sepidan County